Carver is a radio drama by the Scottish composer and writer John Purser about the 16th century Scottish composer Robert Carver. It premiered on BBC Radio 3 on 31 March 1991, in a production recorded on 2 December 1990, produced by Stewart Conn and with music by the Taverner Consort conducted by Andrew Parrott. It won a Giles Cooper Award.

Premiere cast
Peter Hickey
Tom Fleming
James Bryce
Anne Kristen
Gary Bakewell
Iain Agnew
Hilary Maclean
Benny Young
Anne Lacey
Kenneth Glenaan
Stuart Bowman
Stevie Hannan

Notes

Plays based on actual events
British radio dramas
1991 radio dramas
Scottish plays
Plays set in Scotland
Plays based on real people